Sambara is a figure in Buddhist and Hindu mythology.

Sambara may also refer to:
 Sambara, Vizianagaram, a village in Andhra Pradesh, India
 The Shambaa people of northeastern Tanzania
 Sambara (genus), a genus of moths